Rafael Costa may refer to:

 Rafael Sobreira da Costa (born 1981), known as Rafael Paty, Brazilian football forward
 Rafael Costa (footballer, born 1987), Brazilian football striker
 Rafael Costa (footballer, born 1991), Brazilian football attacking midfielder